

Codes 

</onlyinclude>
</onlyinclude>
</onlyinclude>

References

S